Rajarshi Janak University is a national university of Nepal. It was founded in October 2017 by the legislature-parliament after passing a bill as per the Constitution under special co-ordination of former Deputy Prime Minister of Nepal, Bimalendra Nidhi. The university is focused in Madhesh Province. The central office of the university is in Janakpur. The name of university is based on King Janak, the legendary king of Mithila.

Some of the infrastructure of the university were provided by Tribhuvan University based on the government's decisions. The Ramsworup Ramsagar Multiple Campus, previously run by Tribhuvan University, was transferred to Rajarshi Janak University.

Faculties 
The university is involved in agriculture, arts, ayurveda, philosophy, forestry, law, management, medicine and tourism. The university is planning to offer courses on Oriental Philosophy and Mithila Art to promote the culture and civilization of the ancient Mithila. At the early phase, the university started to offer bachelor's courses on public health and law. There are about 200 students. The current faculties of the university are:

 Science & Technology
 Management
 Humanities & Social Sciences

See also
List of universities and colleges in Nepal
Janakpur–Jaynagar Railway

References

Educational institutions established in 2017
Universities and colleges in Nepal
2017 establishments in Nepal